The Daimler-Benz DB 601 was a German aircraft engine built during World War II. It was a liquid-cooled inverted V12, and powered the Messerschmitt Bf 109, Messerschmitt Bf 110, and many others. Approximately 19,000 601's were produced before it was replaced by the improved Daimler-Benz DB 605 in 1942.

The DB 601 was basically an improved DB 600 with direct fuel injection. Fuel injection required power to be taken off the drive shaft, but in return, improved low-RPM performance significantly and provided aerobatic performance in maneuvers where early versions of carburated engines like the British Rolls-Royce Merlin would lose power when the carburetor float bowl ran dry.

The 601's fuel injection provided a significant boost in performance which its competitor, the Junkers Jumo 210, did not match for some time. By the time the fuel-injected 211 arrived, the 601 had already cemented its place as the engine for high-performance designs like fighters, high-speed bombers, and similar roles. The 211 would be relegated to bombers and transport aircraft. In this respect, the 601 was the counterpart to the Merlin engine of roughly the same size and power.

The DB 601Aa was licence-built in Japan by Aichi as the Atsuta, by Kawasaki as the Ha40, and in Italy by Alfa Romeo as the R.A.1000 R.C.41-I Monsone.

Development
Based on the guidelines laid down by the German "Reichverkehrsministerium" (Reich Ministry of Transport), in 1930 Daimler-Benz began development of a new aero engine of the  displacement class: a liquid-cooled inverted-vee 12-cylinder piston engine. This was designated F4, and by 1931 two prototypes were running on the test bench. These were followed by the improved F4B, which became the prototype for the DB 600.

In 1933, Daimler-Benz finally received a contract to develop its new engine and to build six examples of the DB 600. For the year after, the DB 600 was the only German aero engine in the 30-litre class. In total, 2,281 DB 600s were built.

The DB 601A-1 was a development of the DB 600 with mechanical direct fuel injection. Like all DB 601s, it had a 33.9 litre displacement. The first DB 601A-1 prototype, designated as F4E, was test run in 1935, and an order for 150 engines was placed in February 1937.

Serial production began in November 1937, and ended in 1943, after 19,000 examples of all types were produced.

Variants

DB 601 A-1
DB 601 Aa
DB 601 B-1Same as DB601 A-1 for use in Messerschmitt Bf 110 and/or bomber aircraft (different prop/engine ratio, 1:1.88 instead of 1:1.55)
DB 601 BaSimilar to Aa for use in Messerschmitt Bf 110 and/or bomber aircraft (different prop/engine ratio, 1:1.88 instead of 1:1.55)
DB 601 M
For use in the Heinkel He 100D 
DB 601 N
DB 601 P
Same as DB 601 N for use in Messerschmitt Bf 110 and/or bomber aircraft (different prop/engine ratio, 1:1.88 instead of 1:1.55)
DB 601 E
DB 601 F/G
Same as DB 601 E for use in Messerschmitt Bf 110, Messerschmitt Me 210 and/or bomber aircraft (different prop/engine ratio,1:1.875 (601F), 1:2.06 (601G) instead of 1:1.685)
DB 606 A/B
Project initiated in February 1937, to "twin-up" two DB 601As or Es coupled to work on a single propeller shaft with all-up weight of some 1.5 tonnes; for use in Heinkel He 119 (one DB 606) and Messerschmitt Me 261 (twin DB 606) designs, where they worked well in their prototype airframes; saw first combat use with early Heinkel He 177As - 2,700 PS (1,986 kW) at sea level with a mirror-imaged starboard component engine supercharger. Derided as "welded-together engines" by Reichsmarschall Hermann Göring in August 1942, from the problems they caused with engine fires in the He 177A during service from their inadequate installation design.
Alfa-Romeo R.A.1000 R.C.41-I MonsoneLicence built by Alfa Romeo in Italy
Aichi AtsutaLicence built by Aichi in Japan
Kawasaki Ha40Licence built by Kawasaki in Japan

Applications
DB 601
 CANSA FC.20
 Dornier Do 215
 Heinkel He 100
 Henschel Hs 130A-0
 Kawasaki Ki-60
 Messerschmitt Bf 109
 Messerschmitt Bf 110
 Messerschmitt Me 210
 Savoia-Marchetti SM.88

DB 606
 Heinkel He 119
 Heinkel He 177A-1 and A-3
 Junkers Ju 288C
 Messerschmitt Me 261

Licensees
Aichi Atsuta
 Aichi M6A
 Yokosuka D4Y
Alfa Romeo R.A.1000 R.C.41
 Macchi C.202
 Reggiane Re.2001
Kawasaki Ha40
 Kawasaki Ki-61

Specifications (DB 601 Aa / Ba)

See also

References

Bibliography

 Mankau, Heinz and Peter Petrick. Messerschmitt Bf 110, Me 210, Me 410. Raumfahrt, Germany: Aviatic Verlag, 2001. .
 Neil Gregor Daimler-Benz in the Third Reich. Yale University Press, 1998

External links

 Daimler-Benz Aircraft Engines
 Aviation History.com, DB 600 series page
 Kurfürst - Resource on Messerschmitt Bf 109 performance.
(1940) Betriebs und Wartungsvorschrift zum Mercedes-Benz Flugmotor DB 601 A u. B - 1940 dated operation and maintenance manual for the Daimler-Benz DB 601A and DB 601B aircraft engines
 DB 606 "power system" CAD-based animation of crankcase/conrod/piston components

Daimler-Benz aircraft engines
1930s aircraft piston engines
Inverted V12 aircraft engines